Lieutenant-Colonel Désiré Rakotoarijaona (born 19 June 1934) is a Malagasy politician. He was Minister of Economy and Finance from February 1975 to June 1975. He was Prime Minister of Madagascar from 1 August 1977 to 12 February 1988, under President Didier Ratsiraka. Rakotoarijaona was replaced by Victor Ramahatra. Rakotoarijaona also ran in the November 1996 presidential election but finished in last place out of 15 candidates with 0.37% of the vote.

References

1934 births
Living people
Finance ministers of Madagascar
People from Antananarivo
20th-century Malagasy politicians
Prime Ministers of Madagascar